Kevin Martin (born 13 June 1995) is a Swiss professional footballer who plays as a goalkeeper for Swiss Promotion League club Yverdon-Sport FC.

Club career 
Martin made his first steps in professional football with Lausanne-Sport, making nine appearances in the Swiss Super League during the 2016–17 season. In 2018, he signed for Yverdon-Sport.

International career 
Martin made three appearances for the Switzerland U19 team in 2014. He was also called up with the Switzerland U20 team later on, but did not make any appearances.

Career statistics

Honours 
Team Vaud U21

 2. Liga Interregional Group 2: 2013–14

Lausanne-Sport

 Swiss Challenge League: 2015–16

References

1995 births
Living people
Swiss men's footballers
Association football goalkeepers
2. Liga Interregional players
Swiss 1. Liga (football) players
Swiss Challenge League players
Swiss Super League players
Swiss Promotion League players
Yverdon-Sport FC players
FC Lausanne-Sport players
Sportspeople from Lausanne

External links